John Allison Sprague (April 10, 1844 – September 14, 1907) was an Ontario farmer and political figure. He represented Prince Edward in the Legislative Assembly of Ontario from 1886 to 1894 as a Liberal member.

Biography
He was born in Sophiasburgh Township, Canada West in 1844, the son of Hallett Sprague and Mary Allison, and grew up there. In 1864, he married Ellen A. Badgley. He was a justice of the peace and served fifteen years on the township council, also serving as reeve. Sprague was a captain in the local militia. He lived near Demorestville.

With his son Grant, he established a rural telephone company serving Prince Edward County in 1898. He died suddenly in 1907.

References

External links
The Canadian parliamentary companion, 1891 JA Gemmill

Pioneer life on the Bay of Quinte (1900)
The Sprague DNA Project

1844 births
1907 deaths
Ontario Liberal Party MPPs
People from Prince Edward County, Ontario